Gree Electric Appliances Inc. of Zhuhai is a Chinese major appliance manufacturer headquartered in Zhuhai, Guangdong province. It is the world's largest residential air-conditioner manufacturer. The company offers two types of air conditioners: household air conditioners and commercial air conditioners. The company also produces electric fans, water dispensers, heaters, rice cookers, air purifiers, water kettles, humidifiers and induction cookers, among other products. It distributes its products in China and abroad under the brand name Gree. The company has two joint-ventures with Daikin, Zhuhai Gree Daikin Device Co., Ltd., and Zhuhai Gree Daikin Precision Mold Co., Ltd.

History
Gree was established in Zhuhai, Guangdong, in 1989 under its former name of Zhuhai City Haili Cooling Engineering Company Limited. It was restructured and renamed Gree Electric Appliances Inc. of Zhuhai in 1994.  The company started as a nameless factory with 200 employees and annual production of less than 20,000 units.

It was listed on the Shenzhen Stock Exchange in 1996.  The company grew 47% in 2008, despite the global recession, booking $23 billion in contract sales. The company is a multinational enterprise with 70,000 employees and annual production of 65.5 million units. In April 2011, Gree announced that first-quarter net income rose 47 percent from a year earlier to 934.7 million Yuan.

Products 
Gree makes air-conditioners of all types and small household appliances.

Management 
Gree Electric's Chairwoman is Dong Mingzhu, or "Sister Dong" as she is known in China. She was appointed CEO in 2009. She joined the company in 1990. Dong was also the Chairwoman of its largest shareholder at the time, Gree Group, until November 2016. Gree Group was owned by Zhuhai Municipal People's Government (the local government of Zhuhai).

Shareholders
As of 31 December 2015, the largest shareholder of Gree Electric was Gree Group; it was followed by Hebei Jinghai Investment Guarantee (for 8.91%), China Securities Finance (for 2.99%), Central Huijin Investment (for 1.40%). UBS (for 1.21%), Foresea Life Insurance (for 1.14%), Yale University (for 0.95%), Hexie Health Insurance (for 0.80%), chairwoman Dong Mingzhu (for 0.73%) and a private equity fund (for 0.71%).

In 2001 Gree Group owned a 50.289% stake in Gree Electric. Gree Group was also the largest shareholder of Gree Real Estate until 2015.

In December 2019, Gree Group sold most of the stake they owned in Gree Electric, to a private equity fund.

Sponsorships
In 2022, Gree Electric become one of the AFF Mitsubishi Electric Cup 2022 that chosen by Mitsubishi Electric, along with Maspion Holdings, Wuling Motors, Mercedes-Benz, Tiger Brokers and Yanmar.

References

External links
 

Companies in the CSI 100 Index
Companies listed on the Shenzhen Stock Exchange
Chinese companies established in 1989
Electronics companies established in 1989
Home appliance brands
Companies based in Zhuhai
Home appliance manufacturers of China
Heating, ventilation, and air conditioning companies
Chinese brands
Privatization in China
1996 initial public offerings
Multinational companies headquartered in China
Electronics companies of China